The Daegu-class frigate (Hangul: 대구급 호위함, Hanja: 大邱級護衛艦) is a class of guided missile frigates of the Republic of Korea Navy (ROKN). The Daegu class is based on the preceding , and has otherwise been referred to as the Incheon class batch II, or FFG-II. Eight Daegu-class ships are planned, with the final goal of 20–22 frigates (of all types) in the ROKN. The Daegu-class frigates are to be built by Daewoo Shipbuilding & Marine Engineering (DSME) and Hyundai Heavy Industries.

Features

Modifications to the Incheon class include  a TB-250K towed array sonar system and a 16-cell Korean Vertical Launching System (K-VLS) that is able to deploy the K-SAAM, Hong Sang Eo anti-submarine missile, and Haeryong tactical land attack cruise missiles.

The hull design is generally based on the one of the Incheon class. However, as a part of weapon system modifications, the superstructure has been significantly changed. The hangar and a helicopter deck on the stern has been enlarged to support the operation of a 10-ton helicopter.

The Daegu class is the first Korean warship to be equipped with a combined diesel-electric or gas (CODLOG) propulsion system. The propulsion system of the ROKN ships have a gas turbine direct drive and four high speed diesel generators driving two Leonardo DRS permanent magnet electric motors. The Rolls Royce MT30 turbine engine replaces the twin gas turbine layout of the Incheon-class frigates.

The Daegu class provides improved anti-submarine warfare (ASW) capability than the predecessor Incheon class. The improved ASW capability provided by the Hanwha Systems SQS-250K towed array sonar and SQS-240K hull-mounted sonar.

Ships in the class

References 

Frigate classes
Frigates of the Republic of Korea Navy